Jane Brook is the name of a watercourse and the valley that passes through the Darling Scarp, and which was utilised for the Eastern Railway and subsequently a central part of the John Forrest National Park.

Suburb
It is a suburb within the City of Swan.

Local attractions 
There are a number of fine wineries located near Jane Brook, producing premium hand-crafted wines. Most have restaurants serving lunch and dinner. 

References

Suburbs of Perth, Western Australia
Darling Range
Watercourses of Western Australia
Suburbs and localities in the City of Swan